Charles de Bourbon (1401 – 4 December 1456) was the oldest son of John I, Duke of Bourbon and Marie, Duchess of Auvergne.

Biography
Charles was Count of Clermont-en-Beauvaisis from 1424, and Duke of Bourbon and Auvergne from 1434 to his death, although due to the imprisonment of his father after the Battle of Agincourt, he acquired control of the duchy more than eighteen years before his father's death.

In 1425, Charles renewed his earlier betrothal by marrying Agnes of Burgundy (1407–1476), daughter of John the Fearless.

Charles served with distinction in the Royal army during the Hundred Years' War, while nevertheless maintaining a truce with his brother-in-law and otherwise enemy, Philip III, Duke of Burgundy. Both dukes were reconciled and signed an alliance by 1440. He was present at the coronation of Charles VII where he fulfilled the function of a peer and conferred knighthood.

Despite this service, he took part in the "Praguerie" (a revolt by the French nobles against Charles VII) in 1439–1440. When the revolt collapsed, he was forced to beg for mercy from the King, and was stripped of some of his lands. He died on his estates at Château de Moulins in 1456.

Children
Charles and Agnes had eleven children:
 John of Bourbon (1426–1488), Duke of Bourbon
 Marie de Bourbon (1428–1448), married in 1444 John II, Duke of Lorraine
 Philip of Bourbon (1430–1440), Lord of Beaujeu
 Charles of Bourbon (Château de Moulins 1433–1488, Lyon), Cardinal and Archbishop of Lyon and Duke of Bourbon
 Isabella of Bourbon (1434–1465), married Charles, Duke of Burgundy
 Peter of Bourbon, (1438–1503, Château de Moulins), Duke of Bourbon
 Louis of Bourbon (1438 – August 30, 1482, murdered), Prince-Bishop of Liège
 Margaret of Bourbon (February 5, 1439 – 1483, Château du Pont-Ains), married in Moulins on April 6, 1472, Philip II, Duke of Savoy
 Catharine of Bourbon (Liège, 1440 – May 21, 1469, Nijmegen), married on December 28, 1463, in Bruges Adolf II, Duke of Guelders
 Joanna of Bourbon (1442–1493, Brussels), married in Brussels in 1467 John II of Chalon, Prince of Orange
 James of Bourbon (1445–1468, Bruges), unmarried.

References

Sources

 

|-

1401 births
1456 deaths
House of Bourbon (France)
Dukes of Bourbon
Dukes of Auvergne
Counts of Forez
Counts of Isle-Jourdain
Burials at Souvigny Priory
15th-century peers of France
People of the Hundred Years' War